Nasir is a masculine given name, commonly found in Arabic which can mean "helper" or "one who gives victory" (grammatically the Stem I masculine singular active participle of consonantal verb root n-ṣ-r). The female form of the name is Nasira. Alternative spellings of this name, possibly due to transliteration, include Naser, Nasser, Naseer, and Nacer. People with this name include:

People with the given name
 Al-Nasir, Abbasid caliph who ruled from 1158 to 1225
 Nasir ibn Alnas (also known as An-Nasir ibn Alnas) (died 1088), fifth ruler of the Hammadids in Algeria
 Nasir ad-Din Qabacha, Muslim Turkic governor of Multan
 Nasir Jones (born 1973), American Rapper, actor, entrepreneur
 Nasir Adderley (born 1997), American football player
 Nasir Kazmi (1925–1972), Pakistani Urdu poet
 Naser Orić (born 1967), Bosnian military officer during the Bosnian War
 Nasir Gebelli (born 1957), Iranian-American video game developer
 Nasir al-Din Shah (1831–1896), ruler of Qajar dynasty in present-day Iran

People with the surname
 Gamal Abdel Nasser (1918–1970), second President of Egypt
 Vali Nasr (born 1960), Iranian-American Middle Eastern expert
 Hakim Nasir, Pakistani Urdu poet also using the takhallus of Nasir
 Clare Nasir (born 1970), British weather forecaster
 Serdar Nasır, Turkish plastic surgeon
 Felipe Nasr (born 1992), Brazilian racing driver
 Bachtiar Nasir (born 1967), Indonesian ulama

Fictional characters with the name
 Nasir, the main character in the video game Lagoon
 Nasir, character in the TV series Spartacus
 Nasir, a playable character in both Fire Emblem: Path of Radiance and its sequel Fire Emblem: Radiant Dawn
 Nasir, a Saracen character played by Mark Ryan in the British 1980s television series Robin of Sherwood (aired in the US as Robin Hood)
 Nasir Meidan, a fictional character in the Android: Netrunner
 Nasir Khan, a fictional character in the television miniseries The Night Of

See also
 Abdul Nasir
 Naseer (disambiguation)
 Nasira (disambiguation)
 Nasir al-Din
 Nazir (disambiguation)
 Arabic name
 

Arabic masculine given names
Bosniak masculine given names
Turkish masculine given names
Masculine given names